Deh Berenj Qaleh is a village in Badghis Province in north western Afghanistan.

References

External links
Satellite map at Maplandia.com

Populated places in Badghis Province